The Brody School of Medicine at East Carolina University (BSOM) is a public medical school located in Greenville, North Carolina, United States. It offers a Doctor of Medicine program, combined Doctor of Medicine / Master of Public Health and Doctor of Medicine / Master of Business Administration programs, and standalone Doctor of Philosophy and Master of Public Health programs. Brody is a national leader in family medicine, ranking No. 1 in North Carolina and No. 2 nationally in the percentage of graduates who choose careers in family medicine, based on the 2017 American Academy of Family Physicians report on MD-granting medical schools. Brody ranks in the top 10 percent of U.S. medical schools for graduating physicians who practice in the state, practice primary care and practice in rural and underserved areas. Brody graduates currently practice in 83 of North Carolina's 100 counties.

The Brody School of Medicine was first appropriated funds from the General Assembly in 1974. Under the leadership of former Chancellor Leo Warren Jenkins, the first class of 28 students enrolled in 1977. The school's primary mission is "to increase the supply of primary care physicians to serve the state, to enhance the access of minority and disadvantaged students in obtaining a medical education and to improve health status of citizens in eastern North Carolina."

Under the leadership of Dean Michael Waldrum and Executive Dean Jason Higginson, today Brody School of Medicine has a student body of about 470 students and around 450 faculty members and researchers. BSOM organizes research through more than a dozen research centers and institutes, receiving around US $30 million annually in externally funded grants and contracts. BSOM is ranked as a "top medical school" by U.S. News & World Report in primary care, rural medicine, and family medicine.

History

In time, East Carolina University was authorized to establish a health affairs division as a foundation for a medical program, and then a one-year medical school whose participants completed their medical education at the University of North Carolina-Chapel Hill. Finally in 1974, the General Assembly of North Carolina appropriated the funds to establish a four-year medical school at East Carolina University.

The legislature set forth a threefold mission for the ECU School of Medicine: to increase the supply of primary care physicians to serve the state, to improve health status of citizens in eastern North Carolina, and to enhance the access of minority and disadvantaged students to a medical education.

Since 1977, when the first class of 28 students enrolled in the four-year School of Medicine, the institution has grown dramatically in its teaching, research and patient care roles. Today, it is partnered with Vidant Health and Vidant Medical Center. In 1999, it was renamed the Brody School of Medicine at East Carolina University, in recognition of the continuous support of the Brody family, former owners of the Brody's retail chain.

East Carolina University is a pioneer in minimally invasive robotic surgery. On May 3, 2000 at East Carolina's Brody School of Medicine, Dr. Randolph Chitwood performed the first robotic heart valve surgery in North America. Using this technology, surgeons at the school have performed more operations on the heart's mitral valve than any other center in the world by far.  Today the Brody School of Medicine is home to a state of the art integrated cardiovascular disease center, The East Carolina Heart Institute at ECU.

Campus

Brody School of Medicine has facilities on the campus of East Carolina University, which is situated in the western side of Greenville, adjacent to Vidant Medical Center.
 
The medical school facilities at East Carolina University sits in a complex on the health sciences campus of East Carolina's grounds and includes academic, administrative, research and presentation facilities. BSOM is served by one library, the William E. Laupus Library. BSOM does not offer on-campus housing on the Health Sciences Campus, but the campus is home to a new Student Services Center, which boasts a fitness and wellness center, restaurants and convenience stores, meeting and recreation space and study rooms.

The main facility is the Brody Medical Sciences Building.  The Biotechnology Building houses all of the laboratory equipment for the school.  Also housed in this building is the Pediatric Outpatient Center.  The East Carolina Heart Institute at ECU houses the outpatient center and primary teaching and research location for cardiovascular care.  The Family Medicine Center houses the outpatient facility for the Department of Family Medicine.  The facility is soon moving to a separate building that will triple the available space.  The Health Sciences Building houses the Laupus Library, along with the College of Nursing and College of Allied Health Sciences.  The Hardy Building houses the Department of Public Health and Moye Medical Center I houses the General Internal Medicine, Pulmonary and Critical Care and ECU Gastroenterology.  Warren Life Sciences Building houses the administrative and research offices.

Vidant Health (formerly University Health Systems of Eastern Carolina), is associated with the Brody School of Medicine by means of a long standing affiliation agreement with Vidant Medical Center (formerly Pitt County Memorial Hospital), Vidant's 861-bed inpatient facility, acts as the medical school's teaching hospital and "primary teaching site". This facility is located adjacent to the Medical School. Vidant has other constituent elements that include the Bertie Memorial Hospital in Windsor, Chowan Hospital in Edenton, Duplin General Hospital in Kenansville, Heritage Hospital in Tarboro, The Outer Banks Hospital in Nags Head and Roanoke-Chowan Hospital in Ahoskie. In total, Vidant, the largest private employer in eastern North Carolina, serves an area with a population of 1.3 million in 29 eastern counties.

Rankings
Brody is ranked No. 1 in North Carolina and No. 2 nationally in the percentage of graduates who choose careers in family medicine, based on the 2017 American Academy of Family Physicians report on MD-granting medical schools. Brody ranks in the top 10 percent of U.S. medical schools for graduating physicians who practice in the state, practice primary care and practice in rural and underserved areas. U.S. News & World Report. They also rank seventh in the rural medicine subcategory by the same magazine. As of 2020, BSOM's ranking is #31 in Primary Care by U.S. News & World Report.

In 2010, graduates were second in the nation for going to family medicine residency, by the American Academy of Family Physicians (AAFP).The AAFP ranked the school second in 2008 and eighth in 2007 for sending their graduates to family medicine residencies.

Residency and fellowship programs
The following are a list of programs sponsored by BSOM and Vidant Medical Center.

*Are non-ACGME programs

Community involvement

Greenville Community Shelter Clinic 
The Greenville Community Shelter Clinic is a free medical clinic run by medical students.  Primarily, the patients come from the Greenville Community Shelter.  It first opened in 1988 and is housed in the former Agnes Fullilove School in West Greenville.  The students have a general, women and pediatric clinic.  Also, twice a year a dental van provides services.

James D. Bernstein Community Health Center
The James D. Bernstein Community Health Center is a $2.8 million, . facility where low-income, uninsured or medically underserved rural families can receive services tailored just for them with sliding-scale fees.

The program has enabled faculty and students from BSOM and College of Nursing, ECU Physicians Pharmacy Services, Medical Family Therapy, Health Psychology, and Social Work to work and learn side-by-side both in the center and in a partnership with Pitt Community College.  It is located in north Greenville, beside the Pitt-Greenville Airport.

Pirates Vs. Cancer
Pirates Vs. Cancer is a student-led fundraising and advocacy organization that raises money for local children's cancer needs at the James and Connie Maynard Children's Hospital in Greenville, NC. The group was founded at the Brody School of Medicine in December 2016 and officially chartered as a recognized student organization on the East Carolina University campus in the fall of 2017. In 2018, the group formally partnered with the Vidant Health Foundation, a 501(c)3 nonprofit associated with the Vidant Health System, of which Maynard Children's Hospital is a member.

The organization operates throughout the academic year with fundraising efforts centered around an interdisciplinary head-shaving and hair donation event held each April or May on the ECU Health Sciences Campus. Originally comprising solely medical students, the group's leadership and participants now spans numerous departments and disciplines including students, faculty, and staff from medical, dental, nursing, PA, PT, and various other graduate and undergraduate degree programs. As of the third annual fundraiser on April 5, 2019 the organization has raised a total of $86,050 in gross donations for children's cancer-related needs, with $7,639, $25,008, and $53,403 raised in 2017, 2018, and 2019, respectively. In 2019, over 92% of gross funds raised were allocated directly to meeting local needs at Maynard Children's Hospital.

Telehealth network
The School of Medicine contains a Telemedicine Center that allows doctors in Greenville to communicate with patients throughout the east.

Notes

External links
 

East Carolina University divisions
Medical schools in North Carolina
1969 establishments in North Carolina
Educational institutions established in 1969